The ADM-3A was an influential early video display terminal, introduced in 1976. It was manufactured by Lear Siegler and had a 12-inch screen displaying 12 or 24 lines of 80 characters.  It set a new industry low single unit price of $995. Its "dumb terminal" nickname came from some of the original trade publication advertisements. It quickly became commercially successful because of the rapid increase of computer communications speeds, and because of new minicomputer systems released to the market which required inexpensive operator consoles.

History 

Lear Siegler, Inc. (LSI) manufactured its first video display terminal in 1972 – the 7700A.

In 1973, LSI hired a new head of engineering, Jim Placak. He and his team created the ADM-1 later that year. It set a new pricing low in the industry at $1,500. Its lower cost was primarily due to a unique single printed circuit board design. In early 1973 the LSI division in Anaheim, California that manufactured these and other products hired a management team for this product line – a VP, national sales manager, and one regional sales manager – for the western region. The ADM-1 was followed by the ADM-2 in early '74. It had expanded functionality and a detached keyboard.

The initials "ADM" were referred to as meaning "American Dream Machine" in some advertising.

ADM-3
The ADM-3 followed and the first manufactured units were introduced at 1975 National Computer Conference in Anaheim, Calif., May 19–22, 1975, in booth 2348 at a price of $995. Its innovative wave soldered single board design, which included the keyboard and all connectors, was packaged in an original clam shell enclosure.

Within weeks of the launch of the ADM-3, Cagan started to book very large orders. Its 'Dumb Terminal' nickname came from some of the original trade publication ads, and quickly caught on industry wide. Due to two emerging trends, the device immediately became the best selling in the industry. Computer communications speeds were rapidly increasing, and a wave of general purpose and dedicated single application minicomputer systems were hitting the market from dozens of manufacturers. These required inexpensive operator consoles that could match the speeds. With no fast low cost printers available, the ADM-3 (painted in a variety of custom colors for the OEMs) became the de facto standard. By December 20, 1976, the widely used Teletype Model 33 KSR electromechanical printing terminal, which could only print ten characters per second, sold for $895 or $32/month, while the ADM-3, which could display up to 1,920 characters per second, went for $995 or $36/month.

ADM-3 options
The original ADM-3 terminal displayed only capital letters. In 1976, an option was added to allow it to display both lower and upper case. The standard version of the terminal displayed only twelve (rather than twenty-four) rows of eighty characters. In those days RAM was expensive, and halving the display size halved the RAM requirement (and likewise all uppercase required only six bits per character to be stored rather than seven). Further optional add-ons included a graphics card enabling it to emulate a Tektronix 4010 and an extension port which would allow daisy chaining  several ADM-3As on a single RS-232 line.

ADM-3A
In 1976, the ADM-3A was introduced.  The ADM-3A added support for control codes to move the cursor around on the screen, and directly position the cursor at any point in the display. It did not, however, support “clear to end of line” or “clear to end of screen”, or other more advanced codes that appeared in later terminals, such as the VT52 and VT100.

The ADM-3A's overall setup was controlled by 20 DIP switches under the nameplate at the front of the machine, beside the keyboard, including setting speed from 75 to 19,200 baud. The advanced configuration options allowed split speed connection, sending at one rate, and receiving at another.

Hardware 

The 5×7 dot matrix characters were displayed in amber, green, or white phosphor on black (the cursor was 7×9). The keyboard had 59 keys.  The 12-inch monochrome CRT was mounted in the top half of the case, which was hinged in the back and opened like a clamshell. The CRT was typically made by Ball Brothers.

Unlike later terminals, such as the VT100, the ADM-3A did not use a microprocessor in its implementation, but instead used TTL. It did, however, use RAM chips, rather than the Circulating Memory used by earlier terminals, such as the Datapoint 3300.

Legacy 
The use of the HJKL keys for moving the cursor in the vi editor and its descendants originated from the ADM-3A, University of California, Berkeley's Teletype Model 33 replacement, just prior to the vi editor's creation; the cursor-movement arrows were printed on those four keys.  The Home key and tilde label printed on the  key may have additionally led to the establishment of the tilde character ("~") as the representation of the home directory in many Unix shells. The caret character is also commonly used to represent the beginning of line or "home" position in regular expression dialects.

Also common with other terminals,  produced an audible beep unless disabled via DIP switch and  tabbed the cursor to the next tabstop, with tabstops fixed at each 8th character position.   was used to clear the screen.

Finally, the Control key was located above, not below, the Shift key—in the same place where most modern PC keyboards put the Caps Lock key. Many standard Unix key combinations were designed with the QWERTY layout and the ADM-3A's original Ctrl key placement in mind. Many of those key combinations are still in use today, even on non-Unix operating systems. Seasoned computer users familiar with the original layout often claim that the different position of the Ctrl key on modern PC keyboard layouts makes the use of Ctrl key combinations more cumbersome. Solutions exist for many operating systems to switch around the Caps Lock and Ctrl keys in software, thus making the PC keyboard layout more closely resemble the ADM-3A's keyboard layout.

The legacy of the ADM-3A's keyboard also lives on in Japan, where the local layout follows it almost exactly. Local Mac keyboard layouts even retain the ADM-3A's position of the Control key, transposing it with the Caps Lock key.

See also
 Teletype Model 33

Notes

References

External links 

 Lear Siegler ADM-3A on the terminals wiki
 Lear Siegler ADM 3A
 Lear Siegler, Inc. (LSI) Terminal ADM3A
 
 

Computer-related introductions in 1976
Computing output devices
Character-oriented terminal